Paddington was a civil parish and metropolitan borough in London, England. It was an ancient parish in the county of Middlesex, governed by an administrative vestry. The parish was included in the area of responsibility of the Metropolitan Board of Works in 1855 and became part of the County of London in 1889. The parish of Paddington became a metropolitan borough in 1900, following the London Government Act 1899, with the parish vestry replaced by a borough council. In 1965 the borough was abolished and its former area became part of the City of Westminster in Greater London.

History
Its area covered that part of the current City of Westminster west of Edgware Road and Maida Vale, and north of Bayswater Road.  Places in the borough included Paddington, Westbourne Green, Bayswater, Maida Hill, Queens Park, Kensal Green, West Kilburn, Maida Vale. To the south it bordered the Metropolitan Borough of Westminster, to the east, the Metropolitan Borough of St Marylebone.

The borough was abolished on 1 April 1965 by the London Government Act 1963 and its former area merged with that of the Metropolitan Borough of Westminster and the Metropolitan Borough of St Marylebone to form the present-day City of Westminster.

Borough council

Coat of arms
 The borough council's coat of arms, granted by the College of Arms on 5 April 1902, was based on the former Paddington vestry seal. The seal featured crossed swords from the arms of the See of London passing through a mural crown, symbol of local government. To these were added the wolves' heads and blue background from the arms of the first Mayor of the Borough, Sir John Aird. Sir John, who was member of parliament for Paddington North, also donated the mayoral badge and chain.

The arms were blazoned as follows:
Azure, two Swords in Saltire proper pommels and hilts Or enfiled with a Mural Crown of the last. Two Wolves heads erased in Chief Argent.

Town hall
Paddington Town Hall, designed by James Lockyer in the Classical style, dated from 1853. The building, originally the Vestry Hall, was situated on Paddington Green. It was enlarged in 1900 and 1920. Following its closure in 1965, it was demolished to make way for the Westway urban motorway.

Population and area
The population recorded in the Census was:

Paddington Vestry 1801–1899

Metropolitan Borough 1900–1961

Note that the population statistics up to 1891 exclude the area of Kensal Town transferred from Chelsea in 1900.

Politics

Under the Metropolis Management Act 1855 any parish that exceeded 2,000 ratepayers was to be divided into wards; as such the incorporated vestry of Paddington was divided into four wards (electing vestrymen): No. 1 (12), No. 2 (18), No. 3 (18) and No. 4 (24).

In 1894 as its population had increased the incorporated vestry was re-divided into six wards (electing vestrymen): Harrow Road (12), Maida Vale (9), Church (12), Westbourne (12), Lancaster Gate (15) and Hyde Park (12).

The metropolitan borough was divided into eight wards for elections: Church, Harrow Road, Hyde Park, Lancaster Gate East, Lancaster Gate West, Maida Vale, Queen's Park and Westbourne.

Borough council

Parliament constituency
For elections to Parliament, the borough was divided into two and a half constituencies:
Chelsea
Paddington North
Paddington South
In 1918 the borough's representation was reduced to two seats:
Paddington North
Paddington South

See also
 List of mayors of Paddington

References

Further reading
 

Metropolitan boroughs of the County of London
History of the City of Westminster
1900 establishments in the United Kingdom
1965 disestablishments in the United Kingdom
Districts abolished by the London Government Act 1963
Parishes governed by vestries (Metropolis)
Metropolitan Borough of